Erik Jørgensen (17 May 1848 – 15 September 1896) was a Norwegian master gunsmith, well known for his cooperation with Ole Herman Johannes Krag in developing the successful Krag–Jørgensen rifle.

Erik Jørgensen was born in the parish of Asker in Akershus, Norway and grew up on the farm Solstad. He educated himself to be a gunsmith and started working at Kongsberg Våpenfabrikk (the most important Norwegian weapon factory) in 1870. It was here that he met Ole H J Krag, and from 1871 Jørgensen worked with Krag on his rifles. As time went on, Jørgensen turned from just doing work for Krag to be an active participant in the development of the rifle which later became known as the Krag–Jørgensen.

References

Other sources
Norske Militærgeværer etter 1867, by Karl Egil Hanevik, 

Firearm designers
1848 births
1896 deaths
People from Asker
Place of death missing